Raoul van Grinsven (known more commonly as DJ Zany or Zany; born 11 May 1974) is a disc jockey and former member of Shadowlands Terrorists, now specialising in hardstyle. He is currently the owner of Fusion Records.

Zany's 2002 song Be On Your Way has been used as the "Walk on" music for professional darts player Ted Hankey.

Biography
Zany lives in Veldhoven, near Eindhoven. After training as a chef, Zany worked for ten years in an Eindhoven record store. He started as a producer of techno and trance before he started focusing on hardstyle. He has toured abroad both with the Shadowlands Terrorists and performing under his own name.

From 2001, using a variety of pseudonyms, Zany produced EPs and remixes for the Fusion label.

In 2002, Zany started a project under the name Donkey Rollers, which was aired at the Defqon.1 Festival as an act in 2005.

In 2005, Zany gained third place at the Dutch Dance Awards.

Discography

References

External links
Official homepage

1974 births
Living people
Dutch dance musicians
Dutch DJs
People from Veldhoven
Hardstyle musicians
Electronic dance music DJs